Francesco Galli, mostly known by his pseudonym Francesco Napoletano (c. 1470 – 1501) was an Italian Renaissance painter. Previously dismissed by art historians as a weak copyist of Leonardo's work, Francesco Napoletano has been acknowledged as one of the first pupils of Leonardo da Vinci, alogside Giovanni Antonio Boltraffio, Marco d'Oggiono and Salaì – hence one of the original Leonardeschi.

Biography and works

Not much is known about personal life of Francesco Napoletano or definite catalogue of this work, because many attributions to him can be questioned. However, more details emerged after discovery of a certain document in Archivio di Stato di Milano. A document, drafted in Venice on 21 August 1501, revealed a true surname of Francesco Galli, who's parents lived in Naples (however it is not clear if Francesco was born there), date of his death and that he left two of his children, who were still minors, behind. Judging from this fact, Francesco died very young. The document clarifies that Francesco died of plague. 
Kunsthaus Zürich keeps one certain panel, signed by Francesco Napoletano himself – Madonna enthroned between the Saints John the Baptist and Sebastian. 
Another prominent piece, painted by Francesco Napoletano is the so-called Madonna Lia. This painting is based on Study for the Madonna of the Cat, while the face of Mary, mother of Jesus, her robe and jewelry are based on the famous Virgin of the Rocks by Leonardo da Vinci. The background of the painting depicts Castello Sforzesco (at the time still called Castello di Porta Giovia) with additions to the castle, ordered in 1450 by Francesco Sforza. The painting depicts castle Filarete Tower, which had been converted into a gunpowder magazine  and destroyed by lightning in 1521.

Sources

References

External links 

1470s births
People from the Province of Milan
15th-century Italian painters
Italian male painters
Painters from Milan
Italian Renaissance painters
Catholic painters
Pupils and followers of Leonardo da Vinci
1501 deaths